Polly Wog Stew is the first recorded release by Beastie Boys, released as an EP in 1982 on the independent record label Rat Cage. Now out of print in its original form, all eight songs saw reissue on the 1989 punk rock compilation Killed by Death #1 but were removed from the record's subsequent releases when the band repackaged the entire EP, along with the Cooky Puss 12", as the compilation album Some Old Bullshit.

Track listing
All tracks composed by Beastie Boys (Adam Yauch, John Berry, Kate Schellenbach, Michael Diamond).

Track information

"Egg Raid On Mojo"
This is one of the few hardcore punk songs that the band continued to play in later years. Liner notes from the anthology The Sounds of Science state that the song is based on an event where members of the band were denied entry to a club by a bouncer, later returning, dressed in black, to pelt the offender with eggs. Some of the lyrics, such as "We all dressed in black" were reused in the Paul's Boutique song "Egg Man".

The Some Old Bullshit compilation includes an alternate version taped from Tim Sommer's Noise The Show radio program. Two tracks from Polly Wog Stew also appeared on the 1982 ROIR cassette compilation New York Thrash.

Personnel

Beastie Boys
John Berry – guitar
Michael Diamond – vocals, cowbell
Kate Schellenbach – drums, washboard, backing vocals
Adam Yauch – bass guitar,  backing vocals, acoustic guitar

Additional personnel
Dave Parsons, Dave Scilken, Dave-id Busaras, Nick Cooper – backing vocals

References

1982 debut EPs
Beastie Boys EPs
Hardcore punk EPs
Rat Cage Records EPs